The Norman Lear Achievement Award in Television is awarded annually by the Producers Guild of America (PGA) at the Producers Guild Awards ceremonies recognizing the individual's outstanding body of work in television. The award category was instituted in 1989 and first awarded at the 1st Producers Guild Awards.

History 
The award is named after American television producer Norman Lear. As of the 29th Producer Guild Awards, there have been 31 awards presented.

Award winners

 1st: David L. Wolper
 2nd: Grant Tinker
 3rd: Fred de Cordova
 4th: Don Hewitt
 5th: Roy Huggins
 6th: Leonard Goldenson
 7th: Ted Turner
 8th: Edgar Scherick
 9th: Garry Marshall
 10th: Ray Stark
 11th: Aaron Spelling
 12th: David E. Kelley
 13th: Tom Werner, Marcy Carsey, and Caryn Mandabach
 14th: Bud Yorkin
 15th: Lorne Michaels
 16th: John Wells
 17th: Norman Lear 
 18th: Jerry Bruckheimer
 19th: Dick Wolf
 20th: David Chase
 21st: Mark Burnett
 22nd: Tom Hanks
 23rd: Don Mischer
 24th: J. J. Abrams
 25th: Chuck Lorre
 26th: Mark Gordon
 27th: Shonda Rhimes
 28th: James L. Brooks
 29th: Ryan Murphy
 30th: Amy Sherman-Palladino
 31st: Marta Kauffman
 32nd: not awarded
 33rd: Greg Berlanti
 34th: Mindy Kaling

References

Norman Lear Achievement Award
Norman Lear